Flow to HDL tools and methods convert flow-based system design into a hardware description language (HDL) such as VHDL or Verilog.  Typically this is a method of creating designs for field-programmable gate array, application-specific integrated circuit prototyping and digital signal processing (DSP) design.  Flow-based system design is well-suited to field-programmable gate array design as it is easier to specify the innate parallelism of the architecture.

History
The use of flow-based design tools in engineering is a reasonably new trend. Unified Modeling Language is the most widely used example for software design.  The use of flow-based design tools allows for more holistic system design and faster development. C to HDL tools and flow have a similar aim, but with C or C-like programming languages.

Applications 
Most applications are ones which take too long with existing supercomputer architectures.  These include bioinformatics, CFD, financial processing and oil and gas survey data analysis.  Embedded applications that require high performance or real-time data processing are also an area of use.  System-on-a-chip design can also be done using this flow.

Examples 
Xilinx System Generator from Xilinx
StarBridge VIVA from defunct 
Nimbus from defunct Exsedia

External links 
 an overview of flows by Daresbury Labs.
 Xilinx's ESL initiative, some products listed and C to VHDL tools.

See also 
 Application Specific Integrated Circuit (ASIC)
 C to HDL
 Comparison of Free EDA software
 Comparison of EDA Software
 Complex programmable logic device (CPLD)
 ELLA (programming language)
 Electronic design automation (EDA)
 Embedded C++
 Field Programmable Gate Array (FPGA)
 Hardware description language (HDL)
 Handel-C
 Icarus Verilog
 Lustre (programming language)
 MyHDL
 Open source software
 Register transfer notation
 Register transfer level (RTL)
 Ruby (hardware description language)
 SpecC
 SystemC
 SystemVerilog
 Systemverilog DPI
 VHDL
 VHDL-AMS
 Verilog
 Verilog-A
 Verilog-AMS

Hardware description languages